Love Is Strong is the fourth studio album by American country music artist Paul Overstreet. Released in 1992, it produced three singles, "Me and My Baby", "Still Out There Swinging" and "Take Another Run". While this album was not as successful as his previous two, "Me And My Baby" managed to reach the top 40; the others did not. The album itself peaked at #28 on the Billboard Top Christian Albums Chart while only reaching #60 on the Top Country Albums chart.

The song "There But for the Grace of God Go I" also won a Dove Award for Country Recorded Song of the Year at the 24th GMA Dove Awards in 1993.

Content
All songs were written or co-written by Paul Overstreet. "Lord She Sure is Good at Loving Me" was co-written with country music artist Randy Travis. Christian music singers Susan Ashton and Lisa Bevill provided background vocals on several songs while Kathie Baillie, lead singer for the country group Baillie & the Boys, sings backup on "Me and my Baby". Glen Campbell also sings harmony vocals on "What's Going without Saying".

Track listing

Personnel
Taken from liner notes.
Susan Ashton - background vocals on "What's Going Without Saying"
Kathie Baillie - background vocals
Lisa Bevill - background vocals
Mike Brignardello - bass guitar
Glen Campbell - background vocals on "What's Going Without Saying"
Keith Compton - electric guitar
David Davidson - strings
Paul Davis - background vocals
Kim Fleming - background vocals on "Love is Strong"
Paul Franklin - steel guitar, lap steel guitar, pedabro
Sonny Garrish - steel guitar on "Head Over Heels" and "Lord She Sure is Good at Loving Me", lap steel guitar
Steve Gibson - electric guitar, acoustic guitar
Carl Gorodetzky - strings
Buddy Greene - background vocals on "'Till the Answer Comes (Gotta Keep Praying)"
Rob Hajacos - fiddle
Vicki Hampton - background vocals
Christopher Harris - background vocals
Tom Hemby - acoustic guitar, electric guitar
Yvonne Hodges - background vocals
Shane Keister - keyboards
Jana King - background vocals on "Love is Strong" and "Lord She Sure is Good at Loving Me"
Wayne Kirkpatrick - background vocals
Lee Larrison - strings
Paul Leim - drums
Ted Madson - strings
Bob Mason - strings 
Terry McMillan - percussion
Paul Overstreet - lead vocals, background vocals
Matt Rollings - keyboards, piano
Lisa Silver - background vocals
Harry Stinson - background vocals
Alan Umstaed - strings
Gary Van Osdale - strings
D. Bergen White - background vocals on "Love is Strong" and "Lord She Sure is Good at Loving Me"
Kristin Wilkinson - strings
Kelly Willard - background vocals on "What's Going Without Saying" and "'Till the Answer Comes (Gotta Keep Praying)"
Bob Wray - bass guitar
Reggie Young - electric guitar

Chart performance

References

1992 albums
Paul Overstreet albums
Albums produced by Brown Bannister
RCA Records albums